Jonathan Rodney Brockman (born March 20, 1987) is an American former professional basketball player. He was the starting power forward and team captain for the University of Washington men's basketball team. He is the University of Washington's all-time leading rebounder and second-all-time leading scorer in University of Washington history. He grabbed the 1,000th rebound of his career on December 30, 2008, in a win over Morgan State, and became Washington's all-time leading rebounder on January 15, 2009, in a win over Oregon, breaking Doug Smart's school record of 1,051.

High school career
Brockman attended Snohomish High School and was a 4-year letterman. He played alongside his brother for two years. He averaged 22 points per game and 13 rebounds per game as a junior.

In his senior year, he led his Snohomish to a 16–5 record, averaging 29.8 points per game and 12 rebounds per game. He was ranked as the 20th-best prospect in the country and 5th-best among power forwards by Scout.com. He was named to the McDonald's All-American Game and made the semifinals in the 2005 High School Slam Dunk Competition. He was the third-leading scorer in the state of Washington in the 2004–05 season, and was one of the best rebounders in the class of 2005.

Considered a four-star recruit by Rivals.com, Brockman was listed as the No. 13 power forward and the No. 47 player in the nation in 2005.

College career
He played alongside future NBA players Brandon Roy and Bobby Jones and was named to the Pac-10 all-freshman team. He played in the 2006 NCAA tournament, in which Washington lost to UConn in the Sweet 16. Brockman led the Huskies in rebounds and was 7th in the Pac-10. He ended the season with four double-doubles. He has the second-highest total rebounds by a freshman in Husky history and was ranked 2nd in the Pac-10 with his 51.8 field goal percentage.

Professional career

Sacramento Kings (2009–2010) 
Brockman was selected 38th overall in the 2009 NBA draft by the Portland Trail Blazers, and his rights were later traded to the Sacramento Kings for the rights to Jeff Pendergraph. He averaged 5.4 points and 9.2 rebounds in the Las Vegas Summer League following the draft.

Milwaukee Bucks (2010–2012) 
On July 21, 2010, Brockman was traded to the Milwaukee Bucks for Darnell Jackson and a 2011 second-round draft pick.

Limoges CSP (2012–2013) 
On June 27, 2012, Brockman, Jon Leuer, Shaun Livingston, and a draft pick were traded to the Houston Rockets for Samuel Dalembert and draft picks. On October 29, Brockman was waived by Houston. On November 18, 2012, he signed with Limoges CSP of France for the rest of the 2012–13 season.

Élan Chalon (2013–2014) 
In 2013, Brockman played for the New Orleans Pelicans in the Las Vegas Summer League. On June 6, 2013, he signed with Élan Chalon of France for the 2013–14 season.

Riesen Ludwigsburg (2014–2016) 
On November 1, 2014, Brockman was signed by the German club MHP Riesen Ludwigsburg.

After playing overseas for four seasons, Brockman decided to retire prior to the beginning of the 2016–17 season.

Coaching career 
Brockman now works as a head coach for the Granite Falls Middle School 7th-grade boys' basketball team.

Career statistics

NBA

Regular season

|-
| style="text-align:left;"| 
| style="text-align:left;"| Sacramento
| 52 || 4 || 12.6 || .534 || – || .597 || 4.1 || .4 || .3 || .1 || 2.8
|-
| style="text-align:left;"| 
| style="text-align:left;"| Milwaukee
| 63 || 6 || 10.7 || .511 || – || .678 || 2.9 || .3 || .2 || .0 || 2.2
|-
| align="left" | 
| align="left" | Milwaukee
| 35 || 0 || 6.8 || .333 || .000 || .467 || 2.1 || .3 || .1 || .0 || 1.1
|- class="sortbottom"
| style="text-align:center;" colspan="2"| Career
| 150 || 10 || 10.5 || .488 || .000 || .618 || 3.1 || .3 || .2 || .1 || 2.1

College 

|-
| align="left" | 2005–06
| align="left" | Washington
| 33 || 32 || 24.1 || .518 || .000 || .667 || 6.5 || 0.7 || 1.1 || 0.1 || 8.4
|-
| align="left" | 2006–07
| align="left" | Washington
| 32 || 32 || 28.8 || .550 || .000 || .660 || 9.6 || 1.1 || 0.8 || 0.1 || 14.2
|-
| align="left" | 2007–08
| align="left" | Washington
| 32 || 31 || 31.5 || .536 || .000 || .519 || 11.6 || 1.1 || 0.7 || 0.3 || 17.8
|-
| align="left" | 2008–09
| align="left" | Washington
| 34 || 34 || 30.5 || .526 || .000 || .640 || 11.5 || 1.1 || 0.7 || 0.1 || 14.9
|-
| align="left" | Career
| align="left" | 
| 131|| 129 || 28.7 || .534 || .000 || .612 || 9.8 || 1.0 || 0.8 || 0.1 || 13.8

References

External links
 LNB profile
 Eurobasket.com Profile
 RealGM.com Profile
 Washington Huskies Bio

1987 births
Living people
American expatriate basketball people in France
American expatriate basketball people in Germany
Basketball players from Washington (state)
Élan Chalon players
Limoges CSP players
McDonald's High School All-Americans
Riesen Ludwigsburg players
Milwaukee Bucks players
Parade High School All-Americans (boys' basketball)
People from Snohomish, Washington
Portland Trail Blazers draft picks
Power forwards (basketball)
Sacramento Kings players
Washington Huskies men's basketball players
American men's basketball players